The 2022 British motorcycle Grand Prix (officially known as the Monster Energy British Grand Prix) was the twelfth round of the 2022 Grand Prix motorcycle racing season. It was held at the Silverstone Circuit in Silverstone on 7 August 2022.

After Augusto Fernández's win in the Moto2 class, Kalex secured its tenth straight Constructors' Championship.

Background

Riders' entries 
In the MotoGP class, Honda test rider Stefan Bradl continues to replace Marc Márquez in the Repsol Honda Team. In the Moto2 class, Piotr Biesiekirski is riding the Kalex of the SAG Team of the injured Gabriel Rodrigo in this Grand Prix, while Rory Skinner races as a wildcard with the American Racing Kalex. In the Moto3 class, the Italian Nicola Carraro replaces his compatriot Matteo Bertelle in the QJmotor Avintia Racing Team (who had already missed the Dutch TT), who will miss the rest of the season due to the injury of the crusaders.

MotoGP Championship standings before the race 
After retiring in the Dutch TT, Fabio Quartararo sees his advantage in the riders' classification reduced against Aleix Espargaró: the Frenchman leads at 172 points, while the Spaniard is 22 points behind. Johann Zarco is third with 114 points, followed by Francesco Bagnaia (winner in Assen) and Enea Bastianini with respectively 106 and 105 points. In the constructors' classification, Ducati is largely confirmed in the lead with 246 points; Yamaha is second with 172 points, seventeen more than Aprilia. KTM and Suzuki are fourth and fifth with 121 and 101 points, with Honda closing the ranking with 85 points. The team classification sees Aprilia Racing overtake (213 points) against Monster Energy Yamaha MotoGP (197 points), which is reached on equal points by the Ducati Lenovo Team, which overtakes Prima Pramac Racing, now fourth with 184 points, which precedes Red Bull KTM Factory Racing fifth with 164 points.

Moto2 Championship standings before the race 
The riders' classification sees three names collected within a point: Celestino Vietti is joined in the lead by Augusto Fernández (winner in the Netherlands) with 146 points, one more than Ai Ogura; Arón Canet is fourth with 116 points, followed by Tony Arbolino with 104 points. In the constructors' classification, the situation is as follows: Kalex 275 points, Boscoscuro, 57 points, MV Agusta 5 points. Red Bull KTM Ajo leads the team standings with 221 points, seven more than the Idemitsu Honda Team Asia. Flexbox HP40 is third with 178 points ahead of Elf Marc VDS Racing Team and Mooney VR46 Racing Team who have 155 and 146 points respectively.

Moto3 Championship standings before the race 
The riders of the Gas Gas Aspar Team occupy the first two positions of the classification. The gap between Sergio García (182 points) and Izan Guevara (179 points) is only three points; Dennis Foggia is third with 115 points, two more than Ayumu Sasaki, victorious in the previous race, and eight more than Jaume Masià. In the constructors' classification, Gas Gas is first with 235 points and precedes Honda (181 points), KTM (174 points), Husqvarna (133 points) and CFMoto (95 points). The team classification sees Gas Gas Aspar Team dominate with 361 points, with 152 points ahead of Leopard Racing. Red Bull KTM Ajo is third with 155 points, plus 18 points behind Sterilgarda Husqvarna Max and plus 29 on Red Bull KTM Tech 3.

Free practice

MotoGP
In the first session, Johann Zarco was the fastest ahead of Francesco Bagnaia and Álex Rins. In the second session Fabio Quartararo set the best time, followed by Joan Mir and Maverick Viñales. In the third session, Aleix Espargaró finished in first position, with Jorge Martín second and Jack Miller third.

Combinated Free Practice 1-2-3 
The top ten riders (written in bold) qualified in Q2.

Free practice 4 
Johann Zarco was the fastest, followed Maverick Viñales and Jack Miller.

Moto2
In the first session, home rider Jake Dixon was the fastest ahead of Augusto Fernández and Arón Canet. In the second session the roles are reversed between Fernández and Dixon, with Alonso López third, while in the third session the first three positions are identical to FP1.

Combinated Free Practice 
The top fourteen riders (written in bold) qualified in Q2.

Moto3
In the first session Sergio García was the fastest, with Dennis Foggia and Lorenzo Fellon second and third respectively. In the second session the home rider John McPhee preceded Izan Guevara and Xavier Artigas. In the third session Tatsuki Suzuki finished in first position, followed by Deniz Öncü and Daniel Holgado. Sergio García, the championship leader, is eighteenth in the combined standings and is forced to compete in Q1.

Combinated Free Practice 
The top fourteen riders (written in bold) qualified in Q2.

Qualifying

MotoGP

Moto2

Moto3

Warm up

MotoGP 
Maverick Viñales finished at the top of the standings ahead of Suzuki riders Álex Rins and Joan Mir.

Moto2 
Augusto Fernández preceded compatriots Alonso López and Arón Canet.

Moto3 
The first three places in the ranking are occupied by Deniz Öncü, Dennis Foggia and David Muñoz.

Race

MotoGP

Moto2

 Pedro Acosta withdrew from the event due to effects of a broken thigh suffered at the previous round in Assen.
 Sam Lowes was declared unfit from the event following a shoulder dislocation suffered after a FP1 crash.

Moto3

Championship standings after the race
Below are the standings for the top five riders, constructors, and teams after the round.

MotoGP

Riders' Championship standings

Constructors' Championship standings

Teams' Championship standings

Moto2

Riders' Championship standings

Constructors' Championship standings

Teams' Championship standings

Moto3

Riders' Championship standings

Constructors' Championship standings

Teams' Championship standings

Notes

References

External links

2022 MotoGP race reports
motorcycle Grand Prix
2022
motorcycle Grand Prix